Revolutionary Socialist Party (RSP) is a communist party in India. The party was founded on 19 March 1940 by Tridib Chaudhuri and has its roots in the Bengali liberation movement Anushilan Samiti and the Hindustan Socialist Republican Army.

The party got around 0.4% of the votes and three seats in the Lok Sabha elections in 1999 and 2004. It is part of the Left Front (West Bengal), Left Front (Tripura) and Congress-led United Democratic Front (Kerala).

History

Development of Anushilan Marxism
A major section of the Anushilan movement had been attracted to Marxism during the 1930s, many of them studying Marxist–Leninist literature whilst serving long jail sentences. A minority section broke away from the Anushilan movement and joined the Communist Consolidation, and later the Communist Party of India. The majority of the Anushilan Marxists did however, whilst having adopted Marxist–Leninist thinking, feel hesitant over joining the Communist Party.

The Anushilanites distrusted the political lines formulated by the Communist International. They criticised the line adopted at the 6th Comintern congress of 1928 as 'ultra-left sectarian'. The Colonial theses of the 6th Comintern congress called upon the communists to combat the 'national-reformist leaders' and to 'unmask the national reformism of the Indian National Congress and oppose all phrases of the Swarajists, Gandhists, etc. about passive resistance'. Moreover, when Indian left-wing elements formed the Congress Socialist Party in 1934, the CPI branded it as Social Fascist. When the Comintern policy swung towards Popular Frontism at its 1935 congress, at the time by which the majority of the Anushilan movement were adopting a Marxist–Leninist approach, the Anushilan Marxists questioned this shift as a betrayal of the internationalist character of the Comintern and felt that the International had been reduced to an agency of Soviet foreign policy. Moreover, the Anushilan Marxists opposed the notion of 'Socialism in One Country'.

However, although sharing some critiques against the leadership of Joseph Stalin and the Comintern, the Anushilan Marxists did not embrace Trotskyism. Buddhadeva Bhattacharya writes in 'Origins of the RSP' that the "rejection of Stalinism did not automatically mean for them [the Anushlian Samiti] acceptance of Trotskyism. Incidentally, the leninist conception of international socialist revolution is different from Trotsky's theory of Permanent Revolution which deduces the necessity of world revolution primarily from the impossibility of the numerically inferior proletariat in a semi-feudal and semi-capitalist peasant country like Russia holding power for any length of time and successfully undertaking the task of socialist construction in hand without the proletariat of the advanced countries outside the Soviet Union coming to power through an extension of sociaist revolution in these countries and coming to the aid of the proletariat of the U.S.S.R."

Anushilan Marxists adhered to the Marxist–Leninist theory of 'Permanent' or 'Continuous' Revolution. '...it is our interest and task to make the revolution permanent' declared Karl Marx as early as 1850 in course of his famous address to the Communist League, 'until all more or less possessing classes have been forced out of their position of dominance, the proletariat has conquered state power, and the association of proletarians, not only in one country but in all dominant countries of the world, has advanced so far that competition among the proletarians of these countries has ceased and that at least the decisive productive forces are concentrated in the hands of the proletarians.'"

By the close of 1936 the Anushilan Marxists at the Deoli Detention Jail in Rajputana drafted a document formulating their political line. This document was then distributed amongst the Anushilan Marxists at other jails throughout the country. When they were collectively released in 1938 the Anushilan Marxists adopted this document, The Thesis and Platform of Action of the Revolutionary Socialist Party of India (Marxist–Leninist): What Revolutionary Socialism Stands for, as their political programme in September that year.

At this point the Anushilan Marxists, recently released from long jail sentences, stood at a cross-roads. Either they would continue as a separate political entity or they would join an existing political platform. They felt that they lacked the resources to build a separate political party. Joining the CPI was out of the question, due to sharp differences in political analysis. Neither could they reconcile their differences with the Royists. In the end, the Congress Socialist Party, appeared to be the sole platform acceptable for the Anushilan Marxists. The CSP had adopted Marxism in 1936 and their third conference in Faizpur they had formulated a thesis that directed the party to work to transform the Indian National Congress into an anti-imperialist front.

During the summer of 1938 a meeting took place between Jayaprakash Narayan (leader of CSP), Jogesh Chandra Chatterji, Tridib Chaudhuri and Keshav Prasad Sharma. The Anushilan Marxists then discussed the issue with Acharya Narendra Deva. The Anushilan Marxists decided to join CSP, but keeping a separate identity within the party.

In the CSP
The great majority of the Anushilan Samiti had joined the CSP, not only the Marxist sector. The non-Marxists (who constituted about a half of the membership of the Samiti), although not ideologically attracted to the CSP, felt loyalty towards the Marxist sector. Moreover, around 25% of the HSRA joined the CSP. This group was led by Jogesh Chandra Chatterji.

In the end of 1938 Anushilan Marxists began publishing The Socialist from Calcutta. The editor of the journal was Satish Sarkar. Although the editorial board included several senior CSP leaders like Acharya Narendra Deva, it was essentially an organ of the Anushilan Marxist tendency. Only a handful issues were published.

The Anushilan Marxists were soon to be disappointed by developments inside the CSP. The party, at that the time Anushilan Marxists had joined it, was not a homogenous entity. There was the Marxist trend led by J.P. Narayan and Narendra Deva, the Fabian socialist trend led by Minoo Masani and Asoka Mehta and a Gandhian socialist trend led by Ram Manohar Lohia and Achyut Patwardan. To the Anushilan Marxists differences emerged between the ideological stands of the party and its politics in practice. These differences surfaced at the 1939 annual session of the Indian National Congress at Tripuri. Ahead of the session there were fierce political differences between the leftwing Congress president, Subhas Chandra Bose, and the section led by Gandhi. As the risk of world war loomed, Bose wanted to utilise the weakening of the British empire for the sake of Indian independence. Bose was re-elected as the Congress president, defeating the Gandhian candidate. But at the same session a proposal was brought forward by Govind Ballabh Pant, through which gave Gandhi veto over the formation of the Congress Working Committee. In the Subjects Committee, the CSP opposed the resolution along with other leftwing sectors. But when the resolution was brought ahead of the open session of the Congress, the CSP leaders remained neutral. According to Subhas Chandra Bose himself, the Pant resolution would have been defeated if the CSP had opposed it in the open session. J.P. Narayan stated that although the CSP was essentially supporting Bose's leadership, they were not willing to risk the unity of the Congress. Soon after the Tripuri session the CSP organised a conference in Delhi, in which fierce criticism was directed against their 'betrayal' at Tripuri.

The Anushilan Marxists had clearly supported Bose both in the presidential election as well by opposing the Pant resolution. Jogesh Chandra Chatterji renounced his CSP membership in protest against the action by the party leadership.

Soon after the Tripuri session, Bose resigned as Congress president and formed the Forward Bloc. The Forward Bloc was intended to function as a unifying force for all leftwing elements. The Forward Bloc held its first conference on 22–23 June 1939, and at the same time a Left Consolidation Committee consisting of the Forward Bloc, CPI, CSP, the Kisan Sabha, League of Radical Congressmen, Labour Party and the Anushilan Marxists. Bose wanted the Anushilan Marxists to join his Forward Bloc. But the Anushilan Marxists, although supporting Bose's anti-imperialist militancy, considered that Bose's movement was nationalistic and too eccletic. The Anushilan Marxists shared Bose's view that the relative weakness of the British empire during the war should have been utilised by independence movement. At this moment, in October 1939, J.P. Narayan tried to stretch out an olive branch to the Anushilan Marxists. He proposed the formation of a 'War Council' consisting of himself, Pratul Ganguly, Jogesh Chandra Chatterjee and Acharya Narendra Deva. But few days later, at a session of the All India Congress Committee, J.P. Narayan and the other CSP leaders pledged not to start any other movements parallel to those initiated by Gandhi.

Foundation of RSPI(ML)
The Left Consolidation Committee soon fell into pieces, as the CPI, the CSP and the Royists deserted it. Bose assembled the Anti-Compromise Conference in Ramgarh, Bihar, now Jharkhand. The Forward Bloc, the Anushilan Marxists (still members of the CSP at the time), the Labour Party and the Kisan Sabha attended the conference. The conference spelled out that no compromise towards Britain should be made on behalf of the Indian independence movement. At that conference the Anushilan Marxists assembled to launch their own party, the Revolutionary Socialist Party of India (Marxist–Leninist), severing all links to the CSP. The first general secretary of the party was Jogesh Chandra Chatterjee.

The first War Thesis of RSP in 1940 took the call for "turning imperialist war into civil war". But after the attack by Germany on the Soviet Union, the line of the party was clarified. RSP meant that the socialist Soviet Union had to be defended, but that the best way for Indian revolutionaries to do that was to overthrow the colonial rule in their own country. RSP was in sharp opposition to groups like Communist Party of India and the Royist RDP, who meant that antifascists had to support the Allied war effort.

After Independence
In October 1949 the Kerala Socialist Party passed through a split. A section of its cadres, like N. Sreekandan Nair, Baby John and K. Balakrishnan, joined RSP and built a branch of the party in Kerala.

Ahead of the 1952 general election, negotiations took place between RSP and the United Socialist Organisation of India. USOI, a coalition of socialist groups, wanted RSP to join its ranks. RSP declined, but a partial electoral agreement was made. USOI supported RSP candidates in two Lok Sabha constituencies in West Bengal, but in other constituencies USOI and RSP candidates contested against each other. In the end three RSP candidates were elected, 2 from Bengal and 1 from Kerala.

In 1953 Jogesh Chandra Chatterjee left the party and rejoined the Indian National Congress. Tribid Kumar Chaudhuri became the new general secretary of the party.

In 1969 RSP sympathizers in East Pakistan formed the Shramik Krishak Samajbadi Dal. RSP and SKSD maintains a close relations from that moment onwards.

Ahead of the 1977 elections, a section of the party in Kerala broke away and formed the National Revolutionary Socialist Party. The NRSP contested the election in alliance with the Communist Party of India (Marxist).

List of General secretaries
Jogesh Chandra Chatterjee (1940-1953)
Tridib Kumar Chaudhuri
Sushil Bhattacharya (Acting)
Baby John
K. Pankajakshan
T. J. Chandrachoodan (2008-2018)
Kshiti Goswami (2018-2019)
Manoj Bhattacharya (2019–present)

Recent history
In 2000 a severe split affected the Kerala branch, when the regional party chief Baby John broke away and formed Revolutionary Socialist Party (Bolshevik). The RSP(B) joined the Congress-led United Democratic Front.

In 2002 RSP supported, along with the other Left Front parties, the presidential candidature of Lakshmi Sahgal. Saghal, who challenged the main candidate A.P.J. Abdul Kalam, got around 10% of the votes.

The erstwhile RSP, which was part of the LDF for almost three decades, decided to walk out of the LDF in March 2014, after the CPI(M) arbitrarily announced the candidature of politburo member and sitting legislator M.A. Baby for the Kollam Lok Sabha seat. Later RSP was offered the loksabha seat by the UDF. The RSP candidate N.K. Premachandran defeated LDF candidate M.A. Baby in the election of 2014. Later in June 2014, both the factions of RSP in Kerala- RSP(B) and RSP merged. Later, a faction headed by Kovoor Kunjumon left the party to form a new party named Revolutionary Socialist Party (Leninist). The main faction of the RSP successfully defended its bastion Kollam Loksabha seat in 2019 fielding N.K. Premachandran again despite aggressive campaign by the LDF but suffered huge defeats in the 2016 and 2021 Kerala Legislative Assembly elections, with all its candidates losing. But, Kovoor Kunjumon was elected to the Legislative Assembly from Kunnathur, and his party supports the LDF.

Current situation
RSP has always had its stronghold in West Bengal, but has branches in a total of 18 states. In Kerala, it is concentrated to the Kollam area, with support amongst fishing communities. Its Kerala branch originates from a split in the Kerala Socialist Party. K. Pankajakshan, general secretary until 2008, was a KSP member.

RSP is part of the Left Front in West Bengal and Tripura. In Kerala, RSP is the part of the UDF and RSP (Leninist), the faction led by Kovoor Kunjimon is the part of the LDF. In 2021 Kerala Legislative Election RSP participated in 5 seats are Chavara, Kunnathoor, Eravipuram, Attingal and Mattannur. But it did not succeed anywhere. Currently, the RSP's presence in the Kerala Legislative Assembly is said to be Mr. Kovur Kunjumon, who contested as an ILDF representative from Kunnathoor. Kollam MPNK Premachandran is the RSP presence in Parliament.

Splits and Factions 
RSP(Bolshevik)------Led by A.V. Thamarakshan
RSP(Marxist)------Led by Babu Divakaran
RSP(Leninist) Kunjumon------Led by Kovoor Kunjumon MLA (Kunnathur)
RSP(Leninist) Ambalathara------Led by Ambalathara Sreedharan Nair
Revolutionary Socialist Party (Left) RSP(Left) (Sasikumar Kumar Cherukole)--------led by Sasikumar Kumar Cherukole

Principal mass organisations
United Trade Union Congress (UTUC)
Samyukta Kisan Sabha (SKS, Peasants org.)
Revolutionary Youth Front (RYF)
All India Progressive Students' Union (AIPSU)
All India United Mahila Sangha (AIUMS)
Nikhil Banga Mahila Sangha (NBMS, women's wing in West Bengal)
Udbastu Adhikar Raksha Samity

Publications
The Call (English, publication discontinued)
Pravaham (Malayalam)
Ganabarta(Bengali)

Lok Sabha election results

State Assembly election results

Results from the website of the Election Commission of India.

References

External links
 

 
Anushilan Samiti
Political parties established in 1940
Political parties in India
1940 establishments in India
State political parties in Kerala
State political parties in West Bengal